Cannum is a small farming locality near Warracknabeal in Victoria, Australia. Although today Cannum has no schools, it once had multiple primary schools. It had a football team until it folded in 1970.

References

Towns in Victoria (Australia)
Wimmera